The 1939 San Jose State Spartans football team represented San Jose State College during the 1939 college football season.

San Jose State competed in the inaugural year of the California Collegiate Athletic Association (CCAA). The team was classified as an independent for the previous four seasons (1935-1938). The Spartans were led by head coach Dudley DeGroot, in his eighth year, and played home games at Spartan Stadium in San Jose, California.

The Spartans finished the season as undefeated CCAA champions with a final record of thirteen wins and no losses (13-0, 3-0 CCAA). The Spartans dominated their opponents, scoring 324 points for the season while giving up only 29, for an average score of 24–2. Only four opposing teams scored against the Spartans, never more than seven points, and eight teams were shut out.

The Spartans spent two weeks in the Associated Press poll in 1939. They were ranked No. 19 in Week 7 and No. 18 in week 8.

Famed football coach Pop Warner was an advisory coach for the Spartans in 1939 and 1940, helping the team to a 24–1 record over the two seasons. The October 20th game vs. College of the Pacific marked the first time Warner had coached against Amos Alonzo Stagg since the two coaches had met in 1907, when Warner was coaching Carlisle and defeated Stagg's University of Chicago.

Schedule

Team players in the NFL
The following San Jose State players were selected in the 1940 NFL Draft.

The following player ended his San Jose State career in 1939, was not drafted, but played in the NFL.

Notes

References

San Jose State
San Jose State Spartans football seasons
California Collegiate Athletic Association football champion seasons
College football undefeated seasons
San Jose State Spartans Spartans football